Invierno mine (Mina Invierno: lit. Winter Mine) is a coal mine in Riesco Island, Chile, that was active from 2013 to 2020. The mine exported coal to northern Chile and to other countries. The enterprise in charge of the project has declared the works will occupy an area of 1500 ha representing 0.3% of the area of Riesco Island.

In 2016 it was recognized by Mining.com as the southernmost mine on the planet. In 2019 the Third Environmental Court of Valdivia withdrew permission to mine by blasting in Invierno mine, efectively causing the mine to initiate a mine closure process that ended all mining in 2020. The closing of the mine and the COVID-19 pandemic in Chile are credited for the economic downturn Magallanes Region experieced in the early 2020s.

References

2013 establishments in Chile
2020 disestablishments in Chile
Coal mines in Chile
Mines in Magallanes Region
Surface mines in Chile
Former mines in Chile